Bishopsworth is the name of both a council ward of the city of Bristol in the United Kingdom, and a suburb of the city which lies within that ward. Bishopsworth contains many council estates.

As well as the suburb of Bishopsworth, the ward contains the areas of Bedminster Down, Highridge and Withywood.

Bishopsworth
Bishopsworth is a largely residential suburb in south Bristol, England, which was formerly a civil parish.

Bishopsworth was historically the tything of Bishport in the parish of Bedminster in Somerset.  The rural southern parts of Bedminster became the civil parish of Bedminster Without from 1894 to 1898, when that parish was abolished and most of it became the new civil parish of Bishopsworth.  Large parts of the civil parish were absorbed into Bristol in 1930 and 1933, and the civil parish was abolished in 1951, when almost all of it was absorbed into Bristol.

In 1928 the ecclesiastical parish of Bedminster Down was created from the north of Bishopsworth in response to the development of the area. The ecclesiastical parishes of Hartcliffe and Withywood were separated off more recently.

Bishopsworth has an estimated population of 11,444 people (2001 Census). Its municipal services are run by Bristol City Council whilst its local health services are managed by the Bristol Clinical Commissioning Group.

Local facilities include shops and pubs, a public library, community arts centre and an indoor skate park.

During the COVID-19 pandemic in the United Kingdom Bishopsworth experienced a spike in cases in November 2020, with a rolling average of 1,365 cases per 100,000 population.

Church

The first church in Bishopsworth was a small chapel dedicated to St Peter and St Paul built under an arrangement in 1194 between Robert Arthur, lord of the manor, and George de Dunster, prebendary of Bedminster. The agreement provided for a chaplain to visit from Bedminster on Wednesdays, Fridays and Sundays. This provision continued until dissolution in 1540. The chapel was converted into three cottages which stood until the Corporation demolished them in 1961 to make way for a swimming pool, which was built in the early 1970s. The pool has since been converted into a skate park, Campus Pool.

The present church, dedicated to St Peter, was built in 1841–1843. The neo-Norman design was the work of Samuel Charles Fripp. It is a grade II* listed building.

Bishopsworth Manor

Bishopsworth Manor was built around 1720 and is grade II* listed. It was owned in the 1970s and 1980s by the late Denis Bristow who restored much of it to its present state.

Other listed buildings

The School House and attached school rooms in church road were built around 1840 in a Tudor Revival style and is grade II listed. Chestnut Court dates from the early 18th century in an early Georgian style.

Bedminster Down

Bedminster Down is an area of Bristol, England.

Bedminster Down is a suburb of Bristol. Much of the area was built in the 1930s. It extends from Bedminster to Ashton, Bishopworth, Highridge and Uplands, and is a largely residential area. Much of the area is built over disused coal mines.

The Parish Church, built in 1927, is dedicated to St Oswald. The Methodist church in the area shut down in August 2008. The Methodist church consisted of two buildings, the main chapel and a church hall. The main chapel is currently in use as a community arts centre.

Withywood
Withywood is a district of Bristol, England, situated on the southern border of the city, between Hartcliffe and Bishopsworth, just north of Dundry Hill.

It is a large estate, begun in the 1950s. The road links to Withywood are adequate, although they have recently improved with the South Bristol Ring Road

Withywood has a number of primary schools: Fair Furlong, Four Acres, Merchants Academy (phase 1)  and St. Pius. There is a relatively new secondary school, Merchants Academy, which opening in 2008, after the demolition of the former Withywood Community School. All of the schools have relatively large sports fields and grounds (Merchants Academy has 2 astro turfs, along with an onsite gym, also open for the public). Withywood also has its own 'University', a private home on the corner of Bishport Avenue and Queens Road where studying and lectures take place. They have also been a registered charity since 1996.

Queen's Road has a number of shops and the Amelia Nutt Health Clinic. Four Acres road also has shops directly opposite Sherrin Way bus terminus (the end of the journey) next to 'The Rusham' retirement homes.

It has a number of public houses: The Woods (Four Acres, now demolished), Queens Head, Rising Sun (both located on Queen's Road – Rising Sun now shut down. Subsequently this too has now been demolished to make way for more housing) and the Elm Tree.

A big regeneration program is taking place around the area, new apartments on Hengrove Way and further development of The Junction shopping complex, and a proposal of a swimming pool and leisure complex alongside Cineworld,  all within walking distance of Withywood.  The Dundry View Neighbourhood Partnership works with residents in Bedminster Down, Bishopsworth, Hartcliffe, Headley Park, Highridge, Teyfant, Uplands, Whitchurch Park and Withywood.

References

External links

 Bishopsworth Library
 map of Bishopsworth circa 1900
 Withywood Community School
 Hartcliffe and Withywood Community Partnership
 University of Withywood
 Withywood Adventure Playground

Grade II* listed buildings in Bristol
Grade II listed buildings in Bristol
Areas of Bristol
Wards of Bristol
Former civil parishes in Bristol
Places formerly in Somerset